Wei Zhao is a Chinese-American computer scientist who served as rector (president) of the University of Macau from 2008 to 2017. He currently serves as chief research officer and professor at the American University of Sharjah in the United Arab Emirates.

Education
Zhao received his undergraduate degree in physics from Shaanxi Normal University in Xi'an, China in 1982. He then moved to the United States to study at the University of Massachusetts at Amherst, where he earned his master's degree in computer science in 1983, and his PhD in 1986.

Career
From 1990 to 2007 Zhao was a faculty member of Texas A&M University, where he served as chair of the Computer Science Department from 1997 to 2001, and senior associate vice president for research from 2001 to 2007.

From 2007 to 2008 Zhao served as professor and dean of science at Rensselaer Polytechnic Institute. He moved to Macau in 2008 to take up the position of rector (president) of the University of Macau. He held the position for nine years before resigning at the end of 2017 to join the American University of Sharjah as chief research officer in 2018.

Awards
Zhao was elected an IEEE Fellow in 2001.

References 

Year of birth missing (living people)
Living people
Chinese computer scientists
American computer scientists
People from Xi'an
Scientists from Shaanxi
Shaanxi Normal University alumni
University of Massachusetts Amherst alumni
Texas A&M University faculty
Rensselaer Polytechnic Institute faculty
Academic staff of the University of Macau
Academic staff of the American University of Sharjah
Fellow Members of the IEEE
American people of Chinese descent
Educators from Shaanxi